"Easy Love" is a song by Dionne Warwick from her 1980 album No Night So Long. It was the second of two charting singles from the LP.

"Easy Love" was released as a single in the fall of 1980, peaking at number 62 on the U.S. Billboard Hot 100.  It was a bigger Adult Contemporary hit, reaching number 12 on the U.S. AC chart.

The B-side, "We Never Said Goodbye," was also a hit on the R&B chart, peaking at number 41.

Chart history

References

External links
 Lyrics of this song
 

1980 songs
1980 singles
Dionne Warwick songs
Arista Records singles
Songs written by Steve Dorff
Contemporary R&B ballads
1980s ballads